The American Bowl was a series of National Football League pre-season exhibition games that were held at sites outside the United States between 1986 and 2005.

The league started the American Bowl series in 1986 primarily to promote American football in other countries. After successful games in London's Wembley Stadium, the series was expanded to Japan. After 1990, games were also played in Montreal and Berlin to promote the new World League of American Football (later NFL Europe) which started in 1991.

Game history

Previous games outside the U.S.
Several earlier pre-season games involved NFL teams and were played outside the United States, without being labeled "American Bowl" games. Between 1950 and 1983, there were 13 football games involving NFL or AFL teams played on foreign soil. Six games in Canada between 1950–1961 pitted NFL teams against CFL teams with the NFL team winning all six games. These games were a hybrid of US and Canadian football. One game involved an AFL team (the Buffalo Bills, who lost 38–21 to the CFL's Hamilton Tiger-Cats).

There was also a game in 1960 that pitted the Chicago Bears against the New York Giants played in Toronto; this was in return for a 1958 CFL matchup that was played in Philadelphia.[3]

Five games also used the American Bowl format without the name prior to 1986. One of these games was an AFL–NFL matchup, Boston vs. Detroit on August 25, 1969. Firstly, two games were played in Montreal in 1969. Then NFL exhibition games took place in Tokyo (1976), Mexico City (1978), and London (1983) before the term American Bowl was coined. The game in Tokyo was called the "Mainichi Star Bowl" . The game in London was called the Global Cup.

American Bowl games (1986–2005)
At least one American Bowl game was played annually between 1986 and 2003. As many as four were played per year in the early 1990s. The two participating teams were selected by the league. The American Bowl was a fifth pre-season game, played the same weekend as the Pro Football Hall of Fame Game, and did not take away a game from the participating teams' pre-season schedules.

The largest crowd in NFL history was recorded at the American Bowl game at Mexico City on August 15, 1994, when 112,376 people attended the Governor's Cup game between the Dallas Cowboys and Houston Oilers.

In 1996 it was played in Monterrey at the Estadio Universitario. The 1997 game was played in Dublin, Ireland, as well as Toronto (Buffalo and Green Bay).

There were three games in 1998, two in 2000, and thereafter one per year. There was no American Bowl game played in 2004, and from 2000 to 2005 all American Bowl games were played in either Mexico or Japan.

Two 1988 games in Montreal and Gothenburg, Sweden, and a 1993 game in Toronto, are not classed as American Bowl games. This is because they were not arranged by the NFL but, rather, the scheduled home team elected to play there. Montreal held an American Bowl in 1990. At the time Montreal had no CFL team, after the Concordes/Alouettes had folded in 1987, but before the new Alouettes relocated there in 1996. The NFL-backed World League saw the Montreal Machine franchise compete in 1991 and 1992.

Post–American Bowl

The last American Bowl was held in 2005. After taking over the position in 2006, new NFL commissioner Roger Goodell cited the league's new international strategy in the abandonment of international pre-season games as well as the closure of what had by then become NFL Europa after its 2007 season, instead focusing on playing regular season games in foreign countries.

The pre-season game that was scheduled to take place in August 2007 (later postponed to 2009) between the New England Patriots and the Seattle Seahawks at Beijing National Stadium in Beijing, China, was named the China Bowl instead of the American Bowl; that game, too, was eventually canceled before being played.

The first regular season NFL game played outside the United States was held on October 2, 2005, at Estadio Azteca in Mexico City before an NFL regular-season record of 103,467 fans. The Arizona Cardinals defeated the San Francisco 49ers, 31–14. The New York Giants and Miami Dolphins played a regular season game at Wembley Stadium in London on October 28, 2007 (with the Giants winning 13–10), the first ever NFL regular season game to be played outside of North America; similarly, the San Diego Chargers and New Orleans Saints followed suit in October 2008. These games are termed the NFL International Series. In addition to these games, the Buffalo Bills began the Bills Toronto Series, a number of annual pre- and regular-season games in Toronto; the Miami Dolphins beat the Bills 16–3 in the first such game on December 7, 2008.  The series ran from 2008 to 2013.

List of games

Standings

See also
 List of National Football League games played outside the United States

References

 
National Football League exhibition season
Recurring sporting events established in 1986
1986 establishments in the United States
American football in Toronto
American football in Mexico
American football in Australia
American football in Japan
American football in China
American football in London
Recurring sporting events disestablished in 2005